Dodge County is a county in the U.S. state of Nebraska. As of the 2010 United States Census, the population was 36,691. Its county seat is Fremont. The county was formed in 1855 and named after Iowa Senator Augustus C. Dodge.

Dodge County comprises the Fremont, NE Micropolitan Statistical Area, which is also included in the Omaha-Council Bluffs-Fremont, NE-IA Combined Statistical Area.

In the Nebraska license plate system, Dodge County is represented by the prefix 5 (it had the fifth-largest number of vehicles registered in the county when the license plate system was established in 1922).

Geography
The Elkhorn River runs through the NE part of Dodge County. It drains into the Platte River below the SE corner of the county. The Platte River runs along the south line of Dodge County.

Major highways

  U.S. Highway 30
  U.S. Highway 77
  U.S. Highway 275
  Nebraska Highway 79
  Nebraska Highway 91

Adjacent counties

 Burt County – northeast
 Washington County – east
 Douglas County – southeast
 Saunders County – south
 Colfax County – west
 Cuming County – north

Demographics

As of the 2000 United States Census, there were 36,160 people, 14,433 households, and 9,756 families in the county. The population density was 68 people per square mile (26/km2). There were 15,468 housing units at an average density of 29 per square mile (11/km2). The racial makeup of the county was 95.90% White, 0.43% Black or African American, 0.30% Native American, 0.51% Asian, 0.09% Pacific Islander, 2.06% from other races, and 0.72% from two or more races. 3.93% of the population were Hispanic or Latino of any race. 48.1% were of German, 7.6% Irish, 5.7% English and 5.4% American ancestry.

There were 14,433 households, out of which 31.10% had children under the age of 18 living with them, 55.80% were married couples living together, 8.50% had a female householder with no husband present, and 32.40% were non-families. 27.60% of all households were made up of individuals, and 13.40% had someone living alone who was 65 years of age or older. The average household size was 2.42 and the average family size was 2.95.

The county population contained 24.70% under the age of 18, 9.60% from 18 to 24, 26.20% from 25 to 44, 21.90% from 45 to 64, and 17.50% who were 65 years of age or older. The median age was 38 years. For every 100 females there were 93.20 males. For every 100 females age 18 and over, there were 90.00 males.

The median income for a household in the county was $37,188, and the median income for a family was $44,790. Males had a median income of $31,108 versus $20,915 for females. The per capita income for the county was $17,757.  About 5.30% of families and 8.60% of the population were below the poverty line, including 10.30% of those under age 18 and 7.10% of those age 65 or over.

Communities

Cities

 Fremont (county seat)
 Hooper
 North Bend
 Scribner

Villages

 Dodge
 Inglewood
 Nickerson
 Snyder
 Uehling
 Winslow

Census-designated place
 Ames

Other unincorporated communities

 Centerville
 Crowell
 Everett
 Pleasant Valley
 Purple Cane
 Ridgeley
 Webster

Townships

 Cotterell
 Cuming
 Elkhorn
 Everett
 Hooper
 Logan
 Maple
 Nickerson
 Pebble
 Platte
 Pleasant Valley
 Ridgeley
 Union
 Webster

Politics and government
Dodge County voters are strongly Republican. In no national election since 1936 has the county selected the Democratic Party candidate.

In the Nebraska Legislature, Dodge County is represented by Lynne Walz. While elections to the Legislature are nonpartisan, Walz is a Democrat.

Law enforcement
The Dodge County Sheriff's Office (DCSO) is the primary law enforcement agency for Dodge County, Nebraska. The Sheriff's Office is located at 428 N. Broad St in Fremont, Nebraska which is the county seat.

Currently DCSO serves the county and its incorporated cities within the county. The only village that relies solely on DCSO for police services is North Bend, Nebraska which is known as a contract city. All other cities within the county have some type of police department or city marshal.

See also
 Dodge County Sheriff's Office
 National Register of Historic Places listings in Dodge County, Nebraska

References

External links
 Official Website

 
1855 establishments in Nebraska Territory